The 90 nm process is a level of MOSFET (CMOS) fabrication process technology that was commercialized by the 2003–2005 timeframe, by leading semiconductor companies like Toshiba, Sony, Samsung, IBM, Intel, Fujitsu, TSMC, Elpida, AMD, Infineon, Texas Instruments and Micron Technology.

The origin of the 90 nm value is historical, it reflects a trend of 70% scaling every 2–3 years. The naming is formally determined by the International Technology Roadmap for Semiconductors (ITRS).

The 193 nm wavelength was introduced by many (but not all) companies for lithography of critical layers mainly during the 90 nm node. Yield issues associated with this transition (due to the use of new photoresists) were reflected in the high costs associated with this transition.

Even more significantly, the 300 mm wafer size became mainstream at the 90 nm node. The previous wafer size was 200 mm diameter.

History
A 90nm silicon MOSFET was fabricated by Iranian engineer Ghavam Shahidi (later IBM director) with D.A. Antoniadis and H.I. Smith at MIT in 1988. The device was fabricated using X-ray lithography.

Toshiba, Sony and Samsung developed a 90nm process during 20012002, before being introduced in 2002 for Toshiba's eDRAM and Samsung's 2Gb NAND flash memory. IBM demonstrated a 90nm silicon-on-insulator (SOI) CMOS process, with development led by Ghavam Shahidi, in 2002. The same year, Intel demonstrated a 90nm strained-silicon process. Fujitsu commercially introduced its 90nm process in 2003 followed by TSMC in 2004.

Gurtej Singh Sandhu of Micron Technology initiated the development of atomic layer deposition high-k films for DRAM memory devices. This helped drive cost-effective implementation of semiconductor memory, starting with 90nm node DRAM.

Example: Elpida 90 nm DDR2 SDRAM process
Elpida Memory's 90 nm DDR2 SDRAM process.

 Use of 300 mm wafer size
 Use of KrF (248 nm) lithography with optical proximity correction
 512 Mbit
 1.8 V operation
 Derivative of earlier 110 nm and 100 nm processes

Processors using 90 nm process technology
 Sony/Toshiba EE+GS (PlayStation 2) - 2003
 Sony/Toshiba/IBM Cell Processor - 2005
 IBM PowerPC G5 970FX - 2004
 IBM PowerPC G5 970MP - 2005
 IBM PowerPC G5 970GX - 2005
 IBM "Waternoose" Xbox 360 Processor - 2005
 Intel Pentium 4 Prescott - 2004-02
 Intel Celeron D Prescott-256 - 2004-05
 Intel Pentium M Dothan - 2004-05
 Intel Celeron M Dothan-1024 - 2004-08
 Intel Xeon Nocona, Irwindale, Cranford, Potomac, Paxville - 2004-06
 Intel Pentium D Smithfield - 2005-05
 AMD Athlon 64 Winchester, Venice, San Diego, Orleans - 2004-10
 AMD Athlon 64 X2 Manchester, Toledo, Windsor - 2005-05
 AMD Sempron Palermo and Manila - 2004-08
 AMD Turion 64 Lancaster and Richmond - 2005-03
 NVIDIA GeForce 8800 GTS (G80) - 2006
 AMD Turion 64 X2 Taylor and Trinidad - 2006-05
 AMD Opteron Venus, Troy, and Athens - 2005-08
 AMD Dual-core Opteron Denmark, Italy, Egypt, Santa Ana, and Santa Rosa
 VIA C7 - 2005-05
 Loongson (Godson) 2Е STLS2E02 - 2007-04
 Loongson (Godson) 2F STLS2F02 - 2008-07
 MCST-4R - 2010-12
 Elbrus-2S+ - 2011-11

See also

References

External links
PC World Review
Review ITworld
AMD
Fujitsu
Intel
August, 2002 release by Intel

2004 introductions
00090
American inventions
Iranian inventions